North Somerset Council is the local authority of North Somerset, England. It is a unitary authority, having the powers of a non-metropolitan county and district council combined. It provides a full range of local government services including Council Tax billing, libraries, social services, processing planning applications, waste collection and disposal, and it is a local education authority. The council meets at Weston-super-Mare Town Hall.

Powers and functions 

The local authority derives its powers and functions from the Local Government Act 1972 and subsequent legislation. For the purposes of local government, North Somerset is within a non-metropolitan area of England. As a unitary authority, North Somerset Council has the powers and functions of both a non-metropolitan county and district council combined. In its capacity as a district council, it is a billing authority that collects Council Tax and business rates, processes local planning applications and is responsible for housing, waste collection and environmental health. In its capacity as a county council, it is a local education authority, responsible for social services, libraries and waste disposal.

Political composition 

North Somerset unitary council is elected every four years, electing a total of 50 councillors in 20 single-member wards and 15 two-member wards. Since the first election to the unitary authority in 1995, the council has either been under Conservative party control, or no party has held a majority. The Conservatives gained a majority at the 2007 election and retained control until the 2019 election.

The current political composition of the council is:

See also 
North Somerset Council elections

References

External links 

Unitary authority councils of England
Local education authorities in England
Local authorities in Somerset
Leader and cabinet executives
Billing authorities in England
North Somerset